Gloucester Island is a national park in Queensland, Australia, 950 km northwest of Brisbane. It is visible from the town of Bowen.  The island was seen and erroneously named "Cape Gloucester" by British explorer James Cook in 1770. The name "Cape Gloucester" has been used informally for areas on or near Gloucester Island. 

Bird watching is topical from October to April, when thousands of migrating birds can be seen, especially waders. The average altitude of the terrain is 34 meters.

See also

 Protected areas of Queensland

References

National parks of Queensland
Protected areas established in 1994
North Queensland